The 2007 Clásica de San Sebastián cycle race took place in the Basque city of San Sebastián on August 4, 2007.

General Standings

External links
2007 Clásica de San Sebastián on UCI website

2007 UCI ProTour
2007
San